The Hostel is a Ugandan drama series created by Sabiiti "MMC" Moses and Emanuel "BUUBA" Egwel about the lives of university students in their hostels. The show premiered on NTV Uganda in 2011 and ran for four seasons. The fourth season which was titled Serenity saw a fresh new cast and in a new hostel. The season premiered on 23 February 2015.

The series aired on NTV Uganda, DSTV - Africa Magic Entertainment, ZUKU TV and NTV KENYA, Canal France International and their African Partners, eTV, Star Times and Rwanda TV.

The series started airing in the UK on 4 February 2013 on Channel 182 Ben TV for the European continent audience.

Overview
The Hostel is a comedy-drama about the endless hopes & fears, struggle, frustrations, pressures and challenges that affect students at higher institutions of learning especially those who reside in hostels. It features the adaptation to city life, roommates, friendships & hassles, prostitution, romantic liaisons, jealousy, sexual pursuits, hatred, broken hearts, lovers’ joys, academic pressures, college & hostel fees challenges, part-time jobs, independence, ethnic & religious diversity, parental control, career, cross generational sex, hopes & nightmares, AIDS, condoms, alcohol, cigarettes, drugs, parties, loneliness etc.

Reception
The show generally received positive reviews as well as garnering a very big following from Uganda and across the borders.

Production
The Hostel was a collaboration between Sabiiti "MMC" Moses, Emanuel "BUUBA" Egwel and Fast Track Productions in Luzira, Kampala. At the end of season three, the revenue strategy changed as NTV Uganda finally commissioned the production of season 4 on wards. NTV Uganda.
A revamped Hostel Serenity returned to little expectations as much of its loyal audiences had moved on to shows that had replaced them earlier like Deceptions.

Cast 
The series cast mostly young celebrity actors plus a few university students. The major cast includes
Hellen Lukoma
Daniel Omara
Richard Tuwangye
Taryn Kyaze as TESSA
Michael Wawuyo Jr.
Housen Mushema
 Mumba Benon
Kayesu Melissa
Ba3shir (as Josh Akena)

Nominations and awards
Nominated for Best TV show by Teen Buzz Awards; Rated Uganda's No. 1 TV programme by Synovate Research in 2011 and 2012

See also
The Life (2012 film)
Yat Madit
Deception NTV
Balikoowa in the City
Beneath The Lies

References

Ugandan drama television series
2010s Ugandan television series
2011 Ugandan television series debuts
2015 Ugandan television series endings
NTV Uganda original programming
Pearl Magic original programming